Caenis youngi is a species of mayfly in the genus Caenis.

References

Mayflies
Insects described in 1984